Anahit Barseghyan (born March 3, 1994) is an Armenian swimmer. She competed at the 2012 Summer Olympics in the women's 100 metre backstroke. Barseghyan finished in 44th place in the heats.

References

External links
 

1994 births
Living people
Sportspeople from Kharkiv
Armenian female backstroke swimmers
Olympic swimmers of Armenia
Swimmers at the 2010 Summer Youth Olympics
Swimmers at the 2012 Summer Olympics
20th-century Armenian women
21st-century Armenian women